The Davis Nunataks are a small cluster of rock nunataks  northwest of Mount Ward, the feature being a southern outlier of the main body of the Dominion Range. The group was named by the Advisory Committee on Antarctic Names for Ronald N. Davis, a United States Antarctic Research Program geomagnetist-seismologist at South Pole Station, winter 1963.

References 

Nunataks of the Ross Dependency
Dufek Coast